The  is a yakuza group based in Okayama, Japan. The Asano-gumi is a designated yakuza group with an estimated 60 active members.

History
The group restarted as the Asano-gumi with the head of Shin'ichi Asano in April 1952 following Oyama's retirement. Yoshiaki Kushida succeeded as president in September 1983.

Condition
The Asano-gumi has been based in Kasaoka, Okayama ever since its formation.

The Asano-gumi caused conflicts with the Yamaguchi-gumi and the Kyodo-kai in the late 20th century. In one notable case, Asano member(s) shot and murdered two Yamaguchi members in Kurashiki in 1987, as a retaliation for an earlier attack by Yamaguchi member(s) involving carving knives against two Asano members.

Since 1996, the Asano-gumi has been a member of an anti-Yamaguchi federation named the Gosha-kai, along with three other Chugoku-based organizations, the Kyosei-kai, the Kyodo-kai, the Goda-ikka, and the Shikoku-based Shinwa-kai.

References

1945 establishments in Japan
Yakuza groups